Poly [ADP-ribose] polymerase 10 is an enzyme that in humans is encoded by the PARP10 gene.

Poly(ADP-ribose) polymerases (PARPs), such as PARP10, regulate gene transcription by altering chromatin organization by adding ADP-ribose to histones. PARPs can also function as transcriptional cofactors (Yu et al., 2005).[supplied by OMIM]

References

Further reading